Vid Cencic (9 May 1933 – 22 March 2020) was a Uruguayan cyclist. He competed in the individual road race and team time trial events at the 1964 Summer Olympics.

References

External links
 

1933 births
2020 deaths
Uruguayan male cyclists
Uruguayan people of Slovenian descent
Olympic cyclists of Uruguay
Cyclists at the 1964 Summer Olympics